WDXX (100.1 FM, "Dixie Country") is a radio station licensed to serve Selma, Alabama, United States.  The station is owned by Broadsouth Communications, Inc. It airs a country music format and features programming from Premiere Radio Networks.

The station was assigned the WDXX call letters by the Federal Communications Commission on July 1, 1989.

On August 26, 2012, WDXX changed their format from country to adult hits, branded as "Fuzion 100".

On October 7, 2013, WDXX changed their format back to country, branded as "Dixie Country".

Previous logo

References

External links

DXX